The 1931–32 Svenska mästerskapet was the first season of Svenska mästerskapet, a tournament held to determine the Swedish Champions of men's handball. Teams qualified by winning their respective District Championships. The District Champions of Scania, Blekinge, Gothenburg, Västergötland, Stockholm and Ångermanland competed in the tournament. The first two rounds were played in Karlskrona and Sollefteå, with Stockholm being predetermined as the venue for the final. Flottans IF Karlskrona won the title, defeating Stockholms-Flottans IF in the final. The final was played on 29 March in Skeppsholmshallen in Stockholm, and was watched by about 1,000 spectators.

Results

First Round 
 Flottans IF Karlskrona–Ystads GK 12–7
 Stockholms-Flottans IF–Skövde IF 21–9

Second Round 
 Flottans IF Karlskrona–A2 IF 9–7
 Sollefteå GIF–Stockholms-Flottans IF 7–23

Final 
 Stockholms-Flottans IF–Flottans IF Karlskrona 9–15

Champions 
The following players for Flottans IF Karlskrona received winner's medals: Chronzell, Beckman, Fredriksson, Albin Persson (6 goals in the final), Holger Larsson (4), Eve Linder, Malte Hagberg (3), Hasselberg (1) and Waerme (1).

References 

Swedish handball competitions